Tereza Vilišová (born 1981) is a Czech actress. She won the Alfréd Radok Award for Best Actress in 2013 for her role of Amy in the D C Jackson play My Romantic History at the Divadlo Petra Bezruče in Ostrava. At the 2013 Thalia Awards she won the category of Best Actress in a Play for the same work. Vilišová joined Prague's National Theatre in 2015.

References

External links

1981 births
Living people
Actors from Ostrava
Czech television actresses
Czech stage actresses
21st-century Czech actresses
Recipients of the Thalia Award